North Bethesda Market is a property majority-owned by Capri Capital Partners. The JBG Companies were minority owners of the property until 2014 when Capri Capital Partners purchased the remaining 10% stake from JBG, who also managed the property. In 2014 the Bozzuto Management Company took over retail and residential management of the property, a title previously held by JBG.

Points of Interest
North Bethesda Market is a mixed-use project including retail, restaurants, and residences, located on Maryland Route 355 (aka Rockville Pike) across from the White Flint Mall in North Bethesda, Maryland. North Bethesda Market includes the tallest building in Montgomery County, Maryland.  There are plans for a second phase of development, dubbed North Bethesda Market II, which would include an even taller apartment building.

North Bethesda Market includes an LA Fitness, Arhaus, Brio Tuscan Grille, CVS, Seasons 52, Starbucks, and Whole Foods Market.

The North Bethesda Metro station is two blocks from this location.

References

External links 
North Bethesda Market Website

Buildings and structures in Montgomery County, Maryland
Commercial buildings completed in 2010